The Madison Public Library is a public library which serves the residents of Madison, Nebraska. The library offers 23,000 items to library users, including movies, audiobooks, books and magazines.  Around 13,000 items are borrowed by area residents each year. Seven public Internet computers are available.

 The library also hosts an annual summer reading program, with entertainers, crafts, and programming, usually held weekly throughout the summer.

History
The library was originally founded in 1907 by the local Woman's Club of Madison. While the collection was initially held in a location donated by a town doctor, in 1908 it moved to the second floor of city hall. By 1910 the library had a collection of over 1,000 volumes.

References
 

Education in Madison County, Nebraska
Public libraries in Nebraska
Buildings and structures in Madison County, Nebraska